Edvard Sandvik Tagseth (born 23 January 2001) is a Norwegian footballer who plays as a midfielder for Rosenborg.

Career
Edvard Tagseth first caught the attention of the public when he played Norway Cup in 2014 for his hometown team Neset. He later signed a deal with Liverpool as a 14 year old. The first year he trained one week with the Academy every month while the second year he trained two weeks every month. When he turned 16 years old he became a full-time part of the Liverpool F.C. Reserves and Academy. He stayed there until the summer of 2019, when he chose not to renew his contract with the Academy.

Tagseth then later joined Rosenborg in August 2019. He made his first-team debut on 3 October when he came on as a substitute in Rosenborg's Europa League match against PSV Eindhoven. Three days later he got his first start in a league match against Haugesund.

Career statistics

Club

References

External links
 Profile at RBK.no

2001 births
Living people
People from Frosta
Norwegian footballers
Norwegian expatriate footballers
Expatriate footballers in England
Norwegian expatriate sportspeople in England
Rosenborg BK players
Eliteserien players
Norway youth international footballers
Association football midfielders
Sportspeople from Trøndelag